The 1870 Newport (Isle of Wight) by-election was fought on 23 November 1870.  The byelection was fought due to the Death of the incumbent MP of the Liberal Party, Charles Wykeham Martin.  It was won by the Liberal candidate Charles Cavendish Clifford.

References

1870 in England
1870 elections in the United Kingdom
Politics of the Isle of Wight
By-elections to the Parliament of the United Kingdom in Hampshire constituencies
19th century in Hampshire